Karamanlı District is a district of the Burdur Province of Turkey. Its seat is the town of Karamanlı. Its area is 372 km2, and its population is 8,268 (2021).

Composition
There is one municipality in Karamanlı District:
 Karamanlı

There are 8 villages in Karamanlı District:

 Bademli 
 Dereköy 
 Kağılcık 
 Kayalıköy 
 Kılavuzlar 
 Kılçan 
 Manca 
 Mürseller

References

Districts of Burdur Province